Frenette is a surname, not to be confused with Frenett. Notable people with the surname include:

Christiane Frenette (born 1954), Quebec educator and writer
Derek Frenette (born 1971), Canadian professional ice hockey left winger
Jean-Louis Frenette (1920–2008), Social Credit party member of the Canadian House of Commons
Jocelyn Frenette (born 1976), former Canadian football Long snapper
Orville Frenette (born 1927), judge currently serving on the Federal Court of Canada
Peter Frenette (born 1992), American ski jumper
Ray Frenette (born 1935), former politician in New Brunswick, Canada